The Highlands School is a private, PK–12 Catholic college preparatory school in Irving, Texas, United States. It was established in 1986, in the front room of a family's house in Highland Park, Dallas.
The last twenty years, The Highlands School changed location twice. The school itself has seen many upgrades from the addition of a football field and lights to a gymnasium, weight room, and new technology in the classrooms. The Highlands School is fully accredited by the Texas Catholic Conference Education Department (TCCED) since 1999, and by the Southern Association of Colleges and Schools (SACS) since 2006. For the fourth consecutive year, the school has been named by the Acton Institute as one of the "Top 50 Catholic Schools" in the country. In 2012, it was also named a top 50 Catholic High School by the Cardinal Newman Society.

Location
The Highlands School is located in the Las Colinas area of Irving, Texas on Northgate Drive between Texas State Highways 114 and 183. The campus is located next to the University of Dallas and works closely with the school. It is in close proximity to the Dallas-Fort Worth International Airport.

Students
The Highlands School welcomes students of all ethnicities, religions, and economic backgrounds. Although The Highlands School is a Catholic school, it accepts students from all religious backgrounds. The students travel to The Highlands School from households all over the Dallas/Fort Worth Metroplex. Students of The Highlands School excel academically before and after graduation.

Coeducational School
The Highlands School was formerly gender specific from 4th through 12th grade.  It is now coeducational in most classes.

Academics
The Highlands School follows a typical curriculum along with a challenging Roman Catholic theology program. The class schedule allows for seven forty-five-minute classes with a break for lunch. The core curriculum include math, science, English, history/social studies, and theology. Offered electives include Philosophy, Drama, Choir, Yearbook, Drawing, Journalism, Music, Introduction to Art, and Art History.

Athletics

The Highlands School is in the 3A classification of the Texas Association of Private and Parochial Schools (TAPPS). The boys soccer team often plays in a 5A or a 4A district. The middle school sports are in the Dallas Parochial League (DPL), although the football team operates as an independent in order to use players from grades 6–8 for one team as opposed to two teams. The Highlands School varsity soccer team was state champions in 2000, 1999. The reigning girls state high jump champion is also a student at The Highlands School.  Other varsity sports include football, cheerleading, volleyball, boys/girls basketball, boys/girls soccer, baseball, softball, boys/girls track and field, boys/girls tennis, and boys/girls golf.  The junior high school sports include football, cheerleading, volleyball and basketball.

Scholarships and financial aid 
The Highlands School offers the Terrae Altae Scholarship to its students. The Terrae Altae Scholarship is a $2500 scholarship for all four high school years.  This scholarship award is available to incoming 9th grade students who have attended Catholic school and maintain a B average for their 7th and 8th grade year. Limited financial aid is offered to students, at the discretion of the admissions office.

Extracurricular activities
The Highlands School offers several clubs and activities for students. Boys and girls are involved in the Model U.N. Club and take trips to prestigious universities every year to debate students from other schools over various political issues both past and present.  Other student organizations include Chess Club, Yearbook, Drama, Conquest Club, Ecyd Club, Challenge and Math Club, National Honor Society, Student Ambassadors, Student Council and Choir. The school also organizes an annual Battle of the Bands and two field days.

References

External links

Private K-12 schools in Texas
Catholic secondary schools in Texas
Private K-12 schools in Dallas County, Texas
Regnum Christi
Legion of Christ
Educational institutions established in 1986
1986 establishments in Texas